Shaye (also Romanized as Shāye‘; also known as Shāyeh) is a village in Tabadkan Rural District, in the Central District of Mashhad County, Razavi Khorasan Province, Iran. At the 2006 census, its population was 577, in 158 families.

References 

Populated places in Mashhad County